The 1920 New York state election was held on November 2, 1920, to elect the governor, the lieutenant governor, the secretary state, the state comptroller, the attorney general, the state treasurer, the state engineer, two judges of the New York Court of Appeals and a U.S. Senator, as well as all members of the New York State Assembly and the New York State Senate.

History
In August 1919, Judge William H. Cuddeback died, and Abram I. Elkus was appointed to fill the vacancy temporarily. Judge Frederick Collin would reach the constitutional age limit at the end of the year. Thus there were two vacancies on the Court of Appeals to be filled at the state election.

The primaries were held on September 14.

Republican primary

Republican state senator (47th District) George F. Thompson lost the primary to Miller, but ran on the Prohibition ticket, as did Temperance activist Ella A. Boole.

Democratic primary

All Prohibition and Socialist candidates were nominated unopposed in the primaries.

Result
The whole Republican ticket was elected.

The incumbents Smith and Elkus were defeated. The incumbents Newton, Williams and Wadsworth were re-elected. Judges Chase and Crane moved from additional to regular seats on the Court of Appeals.

Notes

Sources
Primary candidates: "Primary Rivals Clash Tomorrow". The New York Times. September 13, 1920. p. 3.
The tickets: "Nominees of All Parties for Public Office, for Election Tuesday, November 2". The New York Times. October 23, 1920. p. 14.
Early returns: "Miller Lead, 64,014, 107 Dists. To Come". The New York Times. November 5, 1920. p. 2.
Result: "Republican Lead up State 500,000". The New York Times. December 12, 1920. p. 1.
Results in Manual for the Use of the State Legislature (1921; see pg. 766ff for Democratic primaries; pg. 769–774 for Republican primaries; pg. 775–798 for the general elections)
Vote totals taken from The New York Red Book 1922

See also
New York gubernatorial elections
New York state elections

1920